Ariel Hernández Azcuy (born May 3, 1970 or April 8, 1972) is a boxer from Cuba, who won two Olympic gold medals in the Middleweight division (71–75 kg); at the 1992 and 1996 Summer Olympics. He captured the world title at the 1995 World Amateur Boxing Championships in Berlin, just two months after having triumphed at the Pan American Games in Mar del Plata.

Amateur accomplishments
 Twice Olympic Gold Medalist (Barcelona 1992, Atlanta 1996)
 Twice Junior World Champion (Bayamon 1989, Lima 1990)
 Twice World Champion (Tampere 1993, Berlin 1995)
 Seven-time Cuban National Champion (1992–1998)
 Twice Goodwill Games Champion (St Petersburg 1994, New York 1998)
 Twice World Championships Challenge Winner (Dublin 1994, Macon 1998)

Olympic results 
1992
 Defeated Joseph Laryea (Ghana) 6-0
 Defeated Gilberto Brown (Virgin Islands) 13-2
 Defeated Sven Ottke (Germany) 14-6
 Defeated Lee Seung-Bae (South Korea) 14-1
 Defeated Chris Byrd (United States) 12-7

1996
 Defeated Kabary Salem (Egypt) 11-2
 Defeated Sven Ottke (Germany) 5-0
 Defeated Alexander Lebziak (Russia) 15-8
 Defeated Rhoshii Wells (United States) 17-8
 Defeated Malik Beyleroğlu (Turkey) 11-3

Pan American Games results 
1995
 Defeated Jorge Melo Silva (Brazil) RSC-1
 Defeated Alex James (Grenada) RSC-1
 Defeated Ronald Simms (United States) KO-1
 Defeated Ricardo Araneda (Chile) 13-0

References 

1970 births
Living people
Boxers at the 1995 Pan American Games
Boxers at the 1992 Summer Olympics
Boxers at the 1996 Summer Olympics
Olympic boxers of Cuba
Olympic gold medalists for Cuba
Olympic medalists in boxing
Cuban male boxers
AIBA World Boxing Championships medalists
Medalists at the 1996 Summer Olympics
Medalists at the 1992 Summer Olympics
Pan American Games gold medalists for Cuba
Pan American Games medalists in boxing
Central American and Caribbean Games gold medalists for Cuba
Competitors at the 1998 Central American and Caribbean Games
Middleweight boxers
Central American and Caribbean Games medalists in boxing
Medalists at the 1995 Pan American Games
People from Pinar del Río Province